Clivina acutipalpis is a species of ground beetle in the subfamily Scaritinae. It was described by Jules Putzeys in 1877.

References

acutipalpis
Beetles described in 1877